Reginald Edward Attache (February 5, 1894 – June 22, 1955), aka Laughing Gas, was a professional American football player who played in the National Football League during the 1922 season for the Oorang Indians. The Indians were a team based in LaRue, Ohio, composed only of Native Americans and coached by Jim Thorpe.

Attache was a Mission Indian who grew up on the Pechanga Indian Reservation in Temecula, California. He attended Sherman Indian High School in Riverside, California, and played college football there.

References

Bibliography

External links
Uniform Numbers of the NFL

Native American players of American football
Players of American football from California
Oorang Indians players
Sportspeople from Temecula, California
1894 births
1955 deaths